Albany is a village in Green County, Wisconsin, United States. The population was 1,018 at the 2010 census. The village is located within the Town of Albany.

Geography

Demographics

As of 2000 the median income for a household in the village was $44,594, and the median income for a family was $46,071. Males had a median income of $30,966 versus $21,061 for females. The per capita income for the village was $19,186. About 0.3% of families and 3.5% of the population were below the poverty line, including none of those under age 18 and 7.4% of those age 65 or over.

2010 census
As of the census of 2010, there were 1,018 people, 434 households, and 274 families residing in the village. The racial makeup of the village was 96.5% White, 0.5% African American, 0.7% Asian, 1.1% from other races, and 1.3% from two or more races. Hispanic or Latino of any race were 2.4% of the population.

There were 434 households, of which 31.3% had children under the age of 18 living with them, 46.3% were married couples living together, 10.6% had a female householder with no husband present, 6.2% had a male householder with no wife present, and 36.9% were non-families. 28.8% of all households were made up of individuals, and 9.9% had someone living alone who was 65 years of age or older. The average household size was 2.35 and the average family size was 2.87.

The median age in the village was 39.8 years. 22.6% of residents were under the age of 18; 7.3% were between the ages of 18 and 24; 28% were from 25 to 44; 30.5% were from 45 to 64; and 11.9% were 65 years of age or older. The gender makeup of the village was 48.3% male and 51.7% female.

Notable people
 John Litel, actor

References

External links
 Village of Albany
 Albertson Memorial Library
 Sanborn fire insurance maps: 1894 1900 1912

Villages in Green County, Wisconsin
Villages in Wisconsin